The 2000 New York Mets season was the 39th regular season for the Mets. They entered the season as defending National League runner ups, losing to the Atlanta Braves in the 1999 NLCS. They went 94–68 and finished 2nd in the NL East, but earned the NL Wild Card. They made it to the World Series where they were defeated by their crosstown rival the New York Yankees. They were managed by Bobby Valentine. They played home games at Shea Stadium.

Offseason
December 10, 1999: Jesse Orosco was traded by the Baltimore Orioles to the New York Mets for Chuck McElroy.
January 19, 2000: Charlie Hayes signed as a free agent with the New York Mets.
January 20, 2000: Curtis Pride was signed as a free agent with the New York Mets.
January 21, 2000: Bill Pulsipher was traded by the Milwaukee Brewers to the New York Mets for Luis Lopez.
March 18, 2000: Jesse Orosco was traded by the New York Mets to the St. Louis Cardinals for Joe McEwing.
March 20, 2000: Charlie Hayes was released by the New York Mets.

Regular season
The Mets played in the first game held outside of North America on Opening Day, March 29. The Mets played the Chicago Cubs in front of over 55,000 at the Tokyo Dome in Tokyo, Japan. The Cubs won the game by a score of 5-3.

Season standings

Record vs. opponents

Transactions
April 26, 2000: Curtis Pride was sent to the Boston Red Sox by the New York Mets as part of a conditional deal.
 May 13, 2000: Rickey Henderson was released by the New York Mets.
June 2, 2000: Bill Pulsipher was traded by the New York Mets to the Arizona Diamondbacks for Lenny Harris.
 July 26, 2000: Justin Huber was signed by the New York Mets as an amateur free agent.
 July 28, 2000: Mike Bordick was traded by the Baltimore Orioles to the New York Mets for Lesli Brea, Mike Kinkade, Melvin Mora, and Pat Gorman (minors).
August 30, 2000: Jorge Velandia was traded by the Oakland Athletics to the New York Mets for Nelson Cruz.

Game log 

|- bgcolor="#fcc"
| 1 || March 29 || Cubs || 3–5 || Lieber (1–0) || Hampton (0–1) || Aguilera (1) || Tokyo Dome || 55,000 || 0–1
|- bgcolor="#cfc"
| 2 || March 30 || @ Cubs || 5–1  || Cook (1–0) || Young (0–1) || — || Tokyo Dome || 55,000 || 1–1
|-

|- bgcolor="#cfc"
| 3 || April 3 || Padres || 2–1 || Leiter (1–0) || Wall (0–1) || Benitez (1) || Shea Stadium || 52,308 || 2–1
|- bgcolor="#fcc"
| 4 || April 5 || Padres || 0–4 || Williams (1–0) || B. J. Jones (0–1) || — || Shea Stadium || 17,585 || 2–2
|- bgcolor="#fcc"
| 5 || April 6 || Padres || 5–8 || Clement (1–0) || Hampton (0–2) || — || Shea Stadium || 17,482 || 2–3
|- bgcolor="#cfc"
| 6 || April 7 || Dodgers || 2–1 || Reed (1–0) || Dreifort (0–1) || Benitez (2) || Shea Stadium || 27,791 || 3–3
|- bgcolor="#fcc"
| 7 || April 8 || Dodgers || 5–6  || Fetters (1–0) || Benitez (0–1) || Shaw (1) || Shea Stadium || 37,814 || 3–4
|- bgcolor="#ccc"
| – || April 9 || Dodgers || colspan=8|Postponed (snow); rescheduled for April 24
|- bgcolor="#fcc"
| 8 || April 10 || @ Phillies || 7–9 || Telemaco (1–0) || Rodriguez (0–1) || Gomes (3) || Veterans Stadium || 47,115 || 3–5
|- bgcolor="#fcc"
| 9 || April 12 || @ Phillies || 5–8 || Person (1–0) || Hampton (0–3) || Gomes (4) || Veterans Stadium || 15,269 || 3–6
|- bgcolor="#cfc"
| 10 || April 13 || @ Phillies || 2–1 || Cook (2–0) || Aldred (0–1) || Benitez (3) || Veterans Stadium || 14,552 || 4–6
|- bgcolor="#cfc"
| 11 || April 14 || @ Pirates || 8–5  || Franco (1–0) || Silva (2–1) || — || Three Rivers Stadium || 20,725 || 5–6
|- bgcolor="#fcc"
| 12 || April 15 || @ Pirates || 0–2 || Anderson (1–0) || Rusch (0–1) || Williams (2) || Three Rivers Stadium || 19,592 || 5–7
|- bgcolor="#cfc"
| 13 || April 16 || @ Pirates || 12–9 || Mahomes (1–0) || Peters (0–1) || Benitez (4) || Three Rivers Stadium || 20,724 || 6–7
|- bgcolor="#cfc"
| 14 || April 18 || Brewers || 10–7 || Hampton (1–3) || Navarro (0–3) || Benitez (5) || Shea Stadium || 17,905 || 7–7
|- bgcolor="#cfc"
| 15 || April 19 || Brewers || 3–1 || Reed (2–0) || Bere (2–1) || Benitez (6) || Shea Stadium || 18,001 || 8–7
|- bgcolor="#cfc"
| 16 || April 20 || Brewers || 5–4  || Wendell (1–0) || Leskanic (0–1) || — || Shea Stadium || 17,002 || 9–7 
|- bgcolor="#ccc"
| – || April 21 || Cubs || colspan=8|Postponed (rain); rescheduled for April 22
|- bgcolor="#cfc"
| 17 || April 22  || Cubs || 8–3 || Rusch (1–1) || Lieber (1–2) || — || Shea Stadium || N/A || 10–7
|- bgcolor="#cfc"
| 18 || April 22  || Cubs || 7–6 || Cook (3–0) || Farnsworth (1–3) || Benitez (7) || Shea Stadium || 32,204 || 11–7
|- bgcolor="#cfc"
| 19 || April 23 || Cubs || 15–8 || Hampton (2–3) || Tapani (0–3) || — || Shea Stadium || 27,560 || 12–7
|- bgcolor="#cfc"
| 20 || April 24 || Dodgers || 1–0 || Benitez (1–1) || Adams (1–1) || — || Shea Stadium || 37,987 || 13–7
|- bgcolor="#cfc"
| 21 || April 25 || Reds || 6–5 || Wendell (2–0) || Sullivan (0–1) || Benitez (8) || Shea Stadium || 27,153 || 14–7
|- bgcolor="#fcc"
| 22 || April 26 || Reds || 1–12 || Neagle (2–0) || Springer (0–1) || — || Shea Stadium || 33,371 || 14–8
|- bgcolor="#fcc"
| 23 || April 27 || Reds || 1–2  || Graves (3–0) || Benitez (1–2) || Sullivan (1) || Shea Stadium || 50,971 || 14–9
|- bgcolor="#fcc"
| 24 || April 28 || @ Rockies || 5–12 || Astacio (2–2) || Hampton (2–4) || — || Coors Field || 45,366 || 14–10
|- bgcolor="#cfc"
| 25 || April 29 || @ Rockies || 13–6 || Reed (3–0) || Yoshii (1–2) || — || Coors Field || 41,220 || 15–10
|- bgcolor="#cfc"
| 26 || April 30 || @ Rockies || 14–11 || Leiter (2–0) || Bohanon (0–3) || — || Coors Field || 36,252 || 16–10
|-

|- bgcolor="#fcc"
| 27 || May 1 || @ Giants || 3–10 || Estes (1–1) || Pulsipher (0–1) || — || Pacific Bell Park || 40,930 || 16–11
|- bgcolor="#fcc"
| 28 || May 2 || @ Giants || 1–7 || Hernandez (1–4) || Rusch (1–2) || — || Pacific Bell Park || 40,930 || 16–12
|- bgcolor="#fcc"
| 29 || May 3 || @ Giants || 5–8  || Rodriguez (1–0) || Wendell (2–1) || — || Pacific Bell Park || 40,930 || 16–13
|- bgcolor="#fcc"
| 30 || May 4 || @ Giants || 2–7 || Rodriguez (2–0) || Reed (3–1) || — || Pacific Bell Park || 40,930 || 16–14
|- bgcolor="#cfc"
| 31 || May 5 || @ Marlins || 4–1 || Leiter (3–0) || Sanchez (3–1) || Franco (1) || Pro Player Stadium || 30,229 || 17–14
|- bgcolor="#fcc"
| 32 || May 6 || @ Marlins || 1–9 || Fernandez (4–3) || Pulsipher (0–2) || — || Pro Player Stadium || 33,401 || 17–15
|- bgcolor="#fcc"
| 33 || May 7 || @ Marlins || 0–3 || Dempster (3–2) || Rusch (1–3) || — || Pro Player Stadium || 25,147 || 17–16
|- bgcolor="#cfc"
| 34 || May 9 || @ Pirates || 2–0 || Hampton (3–4) || Benson (2–4) || Benitez (9) || Three Rivers Stadium || 14,015 || 18–16
|- bgcolor="#fcc"
| 35 || May 10 || @ Pirates || 9–13 || Silva (3–1) || Cook (3–1) || — || Three Rivers Stadium || 13,711 || 18–17
|- bgcolor="#cfc"
| 36 || May 11 || @ Pirates || 3–2 || Leiter (4–0) || Anderson (1–1) || — || Three Rivers Stadium || 16,264 || 19–17
|- bgcolor="#fcc"
| 37 || May 12 || Marlins || 4–6 || Dempster (4–2) || Rusch (1–4) || Alfonseca (12) || Shea Stadium || 30,828 || 19–18
|- bgcolor="#fcc"
| 38 || May 13 || Marlins || 6–7 || Mahay (1–1) || Cook (3–2) || Alfonseca (13) || Shea Stadium || 32,772 || 19–19
|- bgcolor="#cfc"
| 39 || May 14 || Marlins || 5–1 || Hampton (4–4) || Penny (3–5) || — || Shea Stadium || 36,162 || 20–19
|- bgcolor="#fcc"
| 40 || May 16 || Rockies || 3–4  || Tavarez (2–2) || Wendell (2–2) ||  Jimenez (5) || Shea Stadium || 25,697 || 20–20
|- bgcolor="#cfc"
| 41 || May 17 || Rockies || 4–2 || Leiter (5–0) || Arrojo (1–4) || Franco (2) || Shea Stadium || 23,665 || 21–20
|- bgcolor="#ccc"
| – || May 18 || Rockies || colspan=8|Postponed (rain); rescheduled for August 15
|- bgcolor="#cfc"
| 42 || May 19 || Diamondbacks || 4–3 || B. J. Jones (1–1) || Stottlemyre (7–2) || Benitez (10) || Shea Stadium || 25,292 || 22–20
|- bgcolor="#cfc"
| 43 || May 20 || Diamondbacks || 8–7 || Hampton (5–4) || Daal (1–5) || Benitez (11) || Shea Stadium || 37,121 || 23–20
|- bgcolor="#cfc"
| 44 || May 21 || Diamondbacks || 7–6 || Wendell (3–2) || Kim (2–2) || — || Shea Stadium || 38,826 || 24–20
|- bgcolor="#fcc"
| 45 || May 22 || @ Padres || 0–1 || Clement (5–3) || Franco (1–1) || Hoffman (8) || Qualcomm Stadium || 17,966 || 24–21
|- bgcolor="#cfc"
| 46 || May 23 || @ Padres || 5–3  || Wendell (4–2) || Hoffman (0–1) || Benitez (12) || Qualcomm Stadium || 25,783 || 25–21
|- bgcolor="#fcc"
| 47 || May 24 || @ Padres || 4–5 || Wall (1–2) || Mahomes (1–1) || Hoffman (9) || Qualcomm Stadium || 19,405 || 25–22
|- bgcolor="#cfc"
| 48 || May 26 || @ Cardinals || 5–2 || Hampton (6–4) || Thompson (0–1) || Benitez (13) || Busch Stadium || 40,028 || 26–22
|- bgcolor="#cfc"
| 49 || May 27 || @ Cardinals || 12–8 || Cook (4–2) || Veres (0–2) || — || Busch Stadium || 48,690 || 27–22
|- bgcolor="#cfc"
| 50 || May 28 || @ Cardinals || 6–2 || Rusch (2–4) || Kile (7–3) || — || Busch Stadium || 46,344 || 28–22
|- bgcolor="#fcc"
| 51 || May 29 || @ Dodgers || 1–4 || Park (5–4) || Leiter (5–1) || — || Dodger Stadium || 43,084 || 28–23
|- bgcolor="#cfc"
| 52 || May 30 || @ Dodgers || 10–5 || Franco (2–1) || Shaw (2–3) || — || Dodger Stadium || 26,102 || 29–23
|- bgcolor="#fcc"
| 53 || May 31 || @ Dodgers || 3–4 || Fetters (2–0) || Wendell (4–3) || — || Dodger Stadium || 31,323 || 29–24
|-

|- bgcolor="#cfc"
| 54 || June 2 || Devil Rays || 5–3 || Rusch (3–4) || White (1–4) || Benitez (14) || Shea Stadium || 24,123 || 30–24
|- bgcolor="#cfc"
| 55 || June 3 || Devil Rays || 1–0 || Leiter (6–1) || Trachsel (3–6) ||  Benitez (15) || Shea Stadium || 33,694 || 31–24
|- bgcolor="#fcc"
| 56 || June 4 || Devil Rays || 5–15 || Yan (3–3) || B. J. Jones (1–2) || — || Shea Stadium || 43,610 || 31–25
|- bgcolor="#fcc"
| 57 || June 5 || Orioles || 2–4 || Mussina (3–6) || Hampton (6–5) || Timlin (5) || Shea Stadium || 25,192 || 31–26
|- bgcolor="#ccc"
| – || June 6 || Orioles || colspan=8|Postponed (rain); rescheduled for June 8
|- bgcolor="#cfc" 
| 58 || June 7 || Orioles || 11–3 || Mahomes (2–1) || Erickson (2–3) || — || Shea Stadium || 34,492 || 32–26
|- bgcolor="#cfc"
| 59 || June 8 || Orioles || 8–7  || Cook (5–2) || Mercedes (2–3) || — || Shea Stadium || 9,540 || 33–26
|- bgcolor="#cfc"
| 60 || June 9 || @ Yankees || 12–2 || Leiter (7–1) || Clemens (4–6) || — || Yankee Stadium || 55,822 || 34–26
|- bgcolor="#fcc"
| 61 || June 10 || @ Yankees || 5–13 || Pettitte (6–2) || B. J. Jones (1–3) || — || Yankee Stadium || 55,839 || 34–27
|- bgcolor="#ccc"
| – || June 11 || @ Yankees || colspan=8|Postponed (rain); rescheduled for July 8
|- bgcolor="#fcc"
| 62 || June 13 || @ Cubs || 3–4 || Heredia (3–1) || Franco (2–2) || Aguilera (13) || Wrigley Field || 38,879 || 34–28
|- bgcolor="#cfc"
| 63 || June 14 || @ Cubs || 10–8 || Rusch (4–4) || Garibay (1–2) || Benitez (16) || Wrigley Field || 38,625 || 35–28
|- bgcolor="#cfc"
| 64 || June 16 || @ Brewers || 7–1 || Leiter (8–1) || Haynes (7–5) || — || County Stadium || 18,979 || 36–28
|- bgcolor="#fcc"
| 65 || June 17 || @ Brewers || 2–3 || Snyder (2–2) || Rusch (4–5) || Wickman (8) || County Stadium || 26,125 || 36–29
|- bgcolor="#cfc"
| 66 || June 18 || @ Brewers || 7–3 || Reed (4–1) || Bere (4–6) || — || County Stadium || 20,133 || 37–29
|- bgcolor="#fcc"
| 67 || June 20 || Phillies || 2–3  || Brock (3–4) || Benitez (1–3) || Brantley (9) || Shea Stadium || 40,386 || 37–30
|- bgcolor="#fcc"
| 68 || June 21 || Phillies || 5–10 || Gomes (4–4) || Franco (2–3) || — || Shea Stadium || 22,524 || 37–31
|- bgcolor="#cfc"
| 69 || June 22 || Phillies || 5–4 || Rusch (5–5) || Politte (1–2) || Cook (1) || Shea Stadium || 21,005 || 38–31
|- bgcolor="#cfc"
| 70 || June 23 || Pirates || 12–2 || B. J. Jones (2–3) || Arroyo (0–1) || — || Shea Stadium || 39,849 || 39–31
|- bgcolor="#cfc"
| 71 || June 24 || Pirates || 10–8 || Franco (3–3) || Loiselle (0–3) || Benitez (17) || Shea Stadium || 34,894 || 40–31
|- bgcolor="#cfc"
| 72 || June 25 || Pirates || 9–0 || Hampton (7–5) || Benson (6–6) || — || Shea Stadium || 38,984 || 41–31
|- bgcolor="#cfc"
| 73 || June 26 || Marlins || 10–5 || Leiter (9–1) || Cornelius (2–2) || — || Shea Stadium || 19,657 || 42–31
|- bgcolor="#cfc"
| 74 || June 27 || Marlins || 5–2 || Rusch (6–5) || Sanchez (4–7) || Benitez (18) || Shea Stadium || 22,103 || 43–31
|- bgcolor="#cfc"
| 75 || June 28 || Marlins || 6–5 || B. J. Jones (3–3) || Penny (4–7) || Franco (3) || Shea Stadium || 37,252 || 44–31
|- bgcolor="#fcc"
| 76 || June 29 || Braves || 4–6 || Burkett (6–3) || Reed (4–2) || Lightenberg (6) || Shea Stadium || 46,998 || 44–32
|- bgcolor="#cfc"
| 77 || June 30 || Braves || 11–8 || Benitez (2–3) || Mulholland (8–7) || — || Shea Stadium || 52,831 || 45–32
|-

|- bgcolor="#cfc"
| 78 || July 1 || Braves || 9–1 || Leiter (10–1) || Maddux (9–3) || — || Shea Stadium || 44,593 || 46–32
|- bgcolor="#fcc"
| 79 || July 2 || Braves || 2–10 || Glavine (8–5) || Rusch (6–6) || — || Shea Stadium || 45,261 || 46–33
|- bgcolor="#fcc"
| 80 || July 3 || @ Marlins || 0–2 || Almanza (2–0) || Wendell (4–4) || — || Pro Player Stadium || 15,844 || 46–34
|- bgcolor="#fcc"
| 81 || July 4 || @ Marlins || 8–9 || Darensbourg (4–0) || B. M. Jones (0–1) || Alfonseca (26) || Pro Player Stadium || 24,935 || 46–35
|- bgcolor="#cfc"
| 82 || July 5 || @ Marlins || 11–2 || Hampton (8–5) || Smith (0–2) || — || Pro Player Stadium || 14,765 || 47–35
|- bgcolor="#fcc"
| 83 || July 7 || Yankees || 1–2 || Hernandez (8–6) || Leiter (10–2) || Rivera (19) || Shea Stadium || 54,132 || 47–36
|- bgcolor="#fcc"
| 84 || July 8  || Yankees || 2–4 || Gooden (3–3) || B. J. Jones (3–4) || Rivera (20) || Shea Stadium || 54,165 || 47–37
|- bgcolor="#fcc"
| 85 || July 8  || @ Yankees || 2–4 || Clemens (6–6) || Rusch (6–7) || Rivera (21) || Yankee Stadium || 55,821 || 47–38
|- bgcolor="#cfc"
| 86 || July 9 || Yankees || 2–0 || Hampton (9–5) || Pettitte (9–5) || Benitez (19) || Shea Stadium || 54,286 || 48–38
|- bgcolor="bbcaff" 
| colspan=10 | 71st All-Star Game in Atlanta, Georgia
|- bgcolor="#fcc"
| 87 || July 13 || @ Red Sox || 3–4 || Garces (4–0) || Benitez (2–4) || — || Fenway Park || 33,894 || 48–39
|- bgcolor="#cfc"
| 88 || July 14 || @ Red Sox || 6–4 || Mahomes (3–1) || Lowe (2–4) || Benitez (20) || Fenway Park || 33,293 || 49–39
|- bgcolor="#fcc"
| 89 || July 15 || @ Red Sox || 4–6 || Martinez (7–5) || Hampton (9–6) || Lowe (20) || Fenway Park || 33,213 || 49–40
|- bgcolor="#fcc"
| 90 || July 16 || @ Blue Jays || 3–7 || Halladay (4–5) || Leiter (10–3) || Koch (21) || SkyDome || 30,139 || 49–41
|- bgcolor="#cfc"
| 91 || July 17 || @ Blue Jays || 7–5  || Franco (4–3) || Borbon (1–1) || Benitez (21) || SkyDome || 23,129 || 50–41
|- bgcolor="#cfc"
| 92 || July 18 || @ Blue Jays || 11–7 || B. J. Jones (4–4) || Carpenter (7–9) || — || SkyDome || 24,633 || 51–41
|- bgcolor="#cfc"
| 93 || July 19 || @ Expos || 5–3 || Mahomes (4–1) || Kline (1–3) || Benitez (22) || Olympic Stadium || 14,198 || 52–41
|- bgcolor="#fcc"
| 94 || July 20 || @ Expos || 1–4 || Hermanson (8–7) || Hampton (9–7) || Strickland (1) || Olympic Stadium || 13,641 || 52–42
|- bgcolor="#fcc"
| 95 || July 21 || @ Braves || 3–6 || Burkett (7–4) || Leiter (10–4) || Remlinger (8) || Turner Field || 49,313 || 52–43
|- bgcolor="#cfc"
| 96 || July 22 || @ Braves || 4–0 || Reed (5–2) || Maddux (12–4) || — || Turner Field || 48,141 || 53–43
|- bgcolor="#fcc"
| 97 || July 23 || @ Braves || 0–1 || Ashby (6–7) || B. J. Jones (4–5) || — || Turner Field || 46,872 || 53–44
|- bgcolor="#cfc"
| 98 || July 25 || Expos || 5–0 || Rusch (7–7) || Hermanson (8–8) || — || Shea Stadium || 41,028 || 54–44
|- bgcolor="#ccc"
| – || July 26 || Expos || colspan=8|Postponed (rain); rescheduled for July 27
|- bgcolor="#cfc"
| 99 || July 27  || Expos || 9–8 || Franco (5–3) || Strickland (2–1) || Benitez (23) || Shea Stadium || N/A || 55–44
|- bgcolor="#cfc"
| 100 || July 27  || Expos || 4–3 || Hampton (10–7) || Irabu (2–5) || — || Shea Stadium || 35,088 || 56–44
|- bgcolor="#cfc"
| 101 || July 28 || Cardinals || 3–2 || Leiter (11–4) || Hentgen (9–8) || Benitez (24) || Shea Stadium || 42,396 || 57–44
|- bgcolor="#cfc"
| 102 || July 29 || Cardinals || 4–3 || White (4–6) || James (0–2) || Benitez (25) || Shea Stadium || 50,726 || 58–44
|- bgcolor="#cfc"
| 103 || July 30 || Cardinals || 4–2 || B. J. Jones (5–5) || Stephenson (11–7) || — || Shea Stadium || 45,733 || 59–44
|- bgcolor="#fcc"
| 104 || July 31 || Reds || 0–6 || Williamson (4–7) || Rusch (7–8) || Luebbers (1) || Shea Stadium || 42,774 || 59–45
|-

|- bgcolor="#cfc"
| 105 || August 1 || Reds || 3–2 || Hampton (11–7) || Parris (5–14) || Benitez (26) || Shea Stadium || 39,572 || 60–45
|- bgcolor="#cfc"
| 106 || August 2 || Reds || 2–1 || Leiter (12–4) || Dessens (5–1) || Benitez (27) || Shea Stadium || 42,111 || 61–45
|- bgcolor="#cfc"
| 107 || August 4 || @ Diamondbacks || 6–1 || Reed (6–2) || Johnson (15–4) || Cook (2) || Bank One Ballpark || 41,832 || 62–45
|- bgcolor="#cfc"
| 108 || August 5 || @ Diamondbacks || 6–2 || B. J. Jones (6–5) || Guzman (3–2) || R. White (3) || Bank One Ballpark || 41,656 || 63–45
|- bgcolor="#fcc"
| 109 || August 6 || @ Diamondbacks || 5–9 || Reynoso (8–7) || Rusch (7–9) || Mantei (8) || Bank One Ballpark || 39,641 || 63–46
|- bgcolor="#cfc"
| 110 || August 7 || @ Astros || 6–5  || Benitez (3–4) || Green (1–1) || — || Enron Field || 36,536 || 64–46
|- bgcolor="#fcc"
| 111 || August 8 || @ Astros || 3–9 || Powell (1–0) || Leiter (12–5) || — || Enron Field || 38,031 || 64–47
|- bgcolor="#cfc"
| 112 || August 9 || @ Astros || 12–5 || Reed (7–2) || Lima (4–14) || — || Enron Field || 35,432 || 65–47
|- bgcolor="#cfc"
| 113 || August 10 || @ Astros || 10–3 || B. J. Jones (7–5) || McKinght (0–1) || — || Enron Field || 37,870 || 66–47
|- bgcolor="#cfc"
| 114 || August 11 || Giants || 4–1 || Rusch (8–9) || Gardner (7–6) || Benitez (28) || Shea Stadium || 33,944 || 67–47
|- bgcolor="#cfc"
| 115 || August 12 || Giants || 3–2 || Hampton (12–7) || Rodriguez (4–2) || Benitez (29) || Shea Stadium || 50,064 || 68–47
|- bgcolor="#cfc"
| 116 || August 13 || Giants || 2–0 || Leiter (13–5) || Hernandez (11–9) || Franco (4) || Shea Stadium || 39,841 || 69–47
|- bgcolor="#fcc"
| 117 || August 14 || Giants || 1–11 || Ortiz (8–10) || Reed (7–3) || — || Shea Stadium || 35,296 || 69–48
|- bgcolor="#cfc"
| 118 || August 15  || Rockies || 7–5 || Cook (6–2) || House (1–1) || Benitez (30) || Shea Stadium || N/A || 70–48
|- bgcolor="#cfc"
| 119 || August 15  || Rockies || 4–3 || B. J. Jones (8–5) || Chouinard (1–2) || Benitez (31) || Shea Stadium || 29,744 || 71–48
|- bgcolor="#fcc"
| 120 || August 16 || Rockies || 5–7 || Bohanon (7–8) || Rusch (8–10) || G. White (4) || Shea Stadium || 29,832 || 71–49
|- bgcolor="#cfc"
| 121 || August 17 || Rockies || 13–2 || Wendell (5–4) || Yoshii (5–13) || — || Shea Stadium || 42,697 || 72–49
|- bgcolor="#cfc"
| 122 || August 18 || @ Dodgers || 5–3 || R. White (5–6) || Adams (5–5) || Benitez (32) || Dodger Stadium || 47,486 || 73–49
|- bgcolor="#fcc"
| 123 || August 19 || @ Dodgers || 1–4 || Park (12–8) || Reed (7–4) || — || Dodger Stadium || 53,051 || 73–50
|- bgcolor="#cfc"
| 124 || August 20 || @ Dodgers || 9–6 || Wendell (6–4) || Adams (5–6) || Benitez (33) || Dodger Stadium || 46,122 || 74–50
|- bgcolor="#fcc"
| 125 || August 21 || @ Padres || 4–5  || Hoffman (4–4) || Cook (6–3) || — || Qualcomm Stadium || 21,234 || 74–51
|- bgcolor="#fcc"
| 126 || August 22 || @ Padres || 1–16 || Eaton (5–2) || Mahomes (4–2) || Erdos (2) || Qualcomm Stadium || 24,919 || 74–52
|- bgcolor="#cfc"
| 127 || August 23 || @ Padres || 4–1 || Leiter (14–5) || Clement (11–12) || Benitez (34) || Qualcomm Stadium || 26,376 || 75–52
|- bgcolor="#cfc"
| 128 || August 25 || Diamondbacks || 13–3 || Reed (8–4) || Johnson (16–5) || — || Shea Stadium || 38,237 || 76–52
|- bgcolor="#fcc"
| 129 || August 26 || Diamondbacks || 1–5  || Plesac (3–0) || R. White (5–7) || — || Shea Stadium || 43,985 || 76–53
|- bgcolor="#cfc"
| 130 || August 27 || Diamondbacks || 2–1 || Hampton (13–7) || Reynoso (10–9) || Benitez (35) || Shea Stadium || 42,277 || 77–53
|- bgcolor="#cfc"
| 131 || August 28 || Astros || 4–2 || Rusch (9–10) || Powell (1–1) || Wendell (1) || Shea Stadium || 28,472 || 78–53
|- bgcolor="#fcc"
| 132 || August 29 || Astros || 1–11 || Miller (3–5) || Leiter (14–6) || — || Shea Stadium || 39,967 || 78–54
|- bgcolor="#cfc"
| 133 || August 30 || Astros || 1–0 || Reed (9–4) || Holt (6–13) || Benitez (36) || Shea Stadium || 42,507 || 79–54
|-

|- bgcolor="#fcc"
| 134 || September 1 || @ Cardinals || 5–6 || Veres (2–3) || Mahomes (4–3) || — || Busch Stadium || 39,056 || 79–55
|- bgcolor="#fcc"
| 135 || September 2 || @ Cardinals || 1–2 || Kile (16–9) || Hampton (13–8) || — || Busch Stadium || 41,483 || 79–56
|- bgcolor="#fcc"
| 136 || September 3 || @ Cardinals || 3–4  || Morris (3–3) || White (5–8) || — || Busch Stadium || 42,133 || 79–57
|- bgcolor="#fcc"
| 137 || September 4 || @ Reds || 2–6 || Dessens (7–5) || Leiter (14–7) || — || Cinergy Field || 26,571 || 79–58
|- bgcolor="#cfc"
| 138 || September 5 || @ Reds || 3–2  || Wendell (7–4) || Sullivan (2–6) || Benitez (37) || Cinergy Field || 22,664 || 80–58
|- bgcolor="#fcc"
| 139 || September 6 || @ Reds || 8–11 || Riedling (2–0) || Franco (5–4) || Graves (25) || Cinergy Field || 24,681 || 80–59
|- bgcolor="#fcc"
| 140 || September 8 || Phillies || 0–2 || Padilla (4–5) || Hampton (13–9) || Brantley (22) || Shea Stadium || 38,808 || 80–60
|- bgcolor="#fcc"
| 141 || September 9 || Phillies || 3–6 || Person (8–5) || Wendell (7–5) || — || Shea Stadium || 42,324 || 80–61
|- bgcolor="#cfc"
| 142 || September 10 || Phillies || 3–0 || Leiter (15–7) || Daal (3–18) || — || Shea Stadium || 53,775 || 81–61
|- bgcolor="#fcc"
| 143 || September 11 || Brewers || 2–8 || Rigdon (4–4) || Reed (9–5) || — || Shea Stadium || 21,797 || 81–62
|- bgcolor="#cfc"
| 144 || September 12 || Brewers || 10–2 || B. J. Jones (9–5) || Snyder (3–9) || — || Shea Stadium || 22,570 || 82–62
|- bgcolor="#cfc"
| 145 || September 13 || Brewers || 4–1  || Benitez (4–4) || Acevedo (3–7) || — || Shea Stadium || 22,510 || 83–62
|- bgcolor="#cfc"
| 146 || September 14 || @ Expos || 10–4 || Rusch (10–10) || Thurman (4–6) || — || Olympic Stadium || 6,219 || 84–62
|- bgcolor="#fcc"
| 147 || September 15 || @ Expos || 3–4 || Vazquez (10–7) || Wendell (7–6) || Strickland (7) || Olympic Stadium || 6,979 || 84–63
|- bgcolor="#cfc"
| 148 || September 16 || @ Expos || 10–4 || Reed (10–5) || Hermanson (11–14) || — || Olympic Stadium || 9,045 || 85–63
|- bgcolor="#fcc"
| 149 || September 17 || @ Expos || 0–5 || Armas (6–8) || B. J. Jones (9–6) || — || Olympic Stadium || 9,349 || 85–64
|- bgcolor="#fcc"
| 150 || September 18 || @ Braves || 3–6 || Maddux (18–8) || Hampton (13–10) || Rocker (23) || Turner Field || 41,937 || 85–65
|- bgcolor="#fcc"
| 151 || September 19 || @ Braves || 4–12 || Ashby (11–12) || Rusch (10–11) || — || Turner Field || 46,584 || 85–66
|- bgcolor="#cfc"
| 152 || September 20 || @ Braves || 6–3 || Leiter (16–7) || Glavine (19–9) || Benitez (38) || Turner Field || 48,278 || 86–66
|- bgcolor="#fcc"
| 153 || September 21 || @ Phillies || 5–6 || Brantley (2–7) || White (5–9) || — || Veterans Stadium || 17,769 || 86–67
|- bgcolor="#cfc"
| 154 || September 22 || @ Phillies || 9–6 || B. J. Jones (10–6) || Wolf (11–8) || Benitez (39) || Veterans Stadium || 21,128 || 87–67
|- bgcolor="#cfc"
| 155 || September 23 || @ Phillies || 7–3 || Hampton (14–10) || Politte (3–3) || — || Veterans Stadium || 22,570 || 88–67
|- bgcolor="#cfc"
| 156 || September 24 || @ Phillies || 3–2 || Rusch (11–11) || Chen (7–3) || Benitez (40) || Veterans Stadium || 31,391 || 89–67
|- bgcolor="#fcc"
| 157 || September 26 || Braves || 1–7 || Burkett (10–6) || Leiter (16–8) || — || Shea Stadium || 48,270 || 89–68
|- bgcolor="#cfc"
| 158 || September 27 || Braves || 6–2 || Reed (11–5) || Millwood (10–13) || — || Shea Stadium || 48,858 || 90–68
|- bgcolor="#cfc"
| 159 || September 28 || Braves || 8–2 || B. J. Jones (11–6) || Maddux (19–9) || — || Shea Stadium || 52,134 || 91–68
|- bgcolor="#cfc"
| 160 || September 29 || Expos || 11–2 || Hampton (15–10) || Thurman (4–9) || — || Shea Stadium || 28,788 || 92–68
|- bgcolor="#cfc"
| 161 || September 30 || Expos || 4–2 || Wendell (8–6) || Vazquez (11–9) || Benitez (41) || Shea Stadium || 39,468 || 93–68
|-

|- bgcolor="#cfc"
| 162 || October 1 || Expos || 3–2  || Mahomes (5–3) || Powell (0–3) || — || Shea Stadium || 44,869 || 94–68
|-

Roster

Player stats

Batting

Starters by position
Note: Pos = Position; G = Games played; AB = At bats; H = Hits; Avg. = Batting average; HR = Home runs; RBI = Runs batted in

Other batters
Note: G = Games played; AB = At bats; H = Hits; Avg. = Batting average; HR = Home runs; RBI = Runs batted in

Pitching

Starting pitchers
Note: G = Games pitched; IP = Innings pitched; W = Wins; L = Losses; ERA = Earned run average; SO = Strikeouts

Other pitchers
Note: G = Games pitched; IP = Innings pitched; W = Wins; L = Losses; ERA = Earned run average; SO = Strikeouts

Relief pitchers
Note: G = Games pitched; IP = Innings pitched; W = Wins; L = Losses; SV = Saves; ERA = Earned run average; SO = Strikeouts

Playoffs
 Game log 

|- bgcolor=#fcc
| 1 || October 4 || @ Giants || 1–5 || Hernandez (1–0) || Hampton (0–1) || — || Pacific Bell Park || 40,430 || 0–1
|- bgcolor=#cfc
| 2 || October 5 || @ Giants || 5–4  || Benitez (1–0) || Rodriguez (0–1) || Franco (1) || Pacific Bell Park || 40,430 || 1–1
|- bgcolor=#cfc
| 3 || October 7 || Giants || 3–2  || White (1–0) || Fultz (0–1) || — || Shea Stadium || 56,270 || 2–1
|- bgcolor=#cfc
| 4 || October 8 || Giants || 4–0 || B. J. Jones (1–0) || Gardner (0–1) || — || Shea Stadium || 56,245 || 3–1
|-

|- bgcolor=#cfc
| 1 || October 11 || @ Cardinals || 6–2 || Hampton (1–0) || Kile (0–1) || — || Busch Stadium || 52,255 || 1–0
|- bgcolor=#cfc
| 2 || October 12 || @ Cardinals || 6–5 || Wendell (1–0) || Timlin (0–1) || Benitez (1) || Busch Stadium || 52,250 || 2–0
|- bgcolor=#fcc
| 3 || October 14 || Cardinals || 2–8 || Benes (1–0) || Reed (0–1) || — || Shea Stadium || 55,693 || 2–1
|- bgcolor=#cfc
| 4 || October 15 || Cardinals || 10–6 || Rusch (1–0) || Kile (0–2) || — || Shea Stadium || 55,665 || 3–1
|- bgcolor=#cfc
| 5 || October 16 || Cardinals || 7–0 || Hampton (2–0) || Hentgen (0–1) || — || Shea Stadium || 55,695 || 4–1
|-

|- bgcolor=#fcc
| 1 || October 21 || @ Yankees || 3–4  || Stanton (1–0) || Wendell (0–1) || — || Yankee Stadium || 55,913 || 0–1
|- bgcolor=#fcc
| 2 || October 22 || @ Yankees || 5–6 || Clemens (1–0) || Hampton (0–1) || — || Yankee Stadium || 56,059 || 0–2
|- bgcolor=#cfc
| 3 || October 24 || Yankees || 4–2 || Franco (1–0) || Hernandez (0–1) || Benitez (1) || Shea Stadium || 55,299 || 2–1
|- bgcolor=#fcc
| 4 || October 25 || Yankees || 2–3 || Nelson (1–0) || B. J. Jones (0–1) || Rivera (1) || Shea Stadium || 55,290 || 3–1
|- bgcolor=#fcc
| 5 || October 26 || Yankees || 2–4 || Stanton (2–0) || Leiter (0–1) || Rivera (2) || Shea Stadium''' || 55,292 || 4–1
|-

Awards and honors
 Mike Hampton, Pitcher, National League Championship Series Most Valuable Player
 Al Leiter, Pitcher, Roberto Clemente Award

Farm system

References

External links
2000 New York Mets at Baseball Reference
2000 New York Mets team page at www.baseball-almanac.com

New York Mets seasons
National League champion seasons
New York Mets
New York Mets
2000s in Queens